Euzopherodes allocrossa is a species of snout moth in the genus Euzopherodes. It was described by Oswald Bertram Lower in 1903 and is found in Australia.

References

Moths described in 1903
Phycitini